
Malin to Mizen (or Mizen to Malin) is the traversal of the whole length of the island of Ireland between two extremities in the southwest and north from Mizen Head (Ireland's most southerly point in County Cork) to Malin Head in County Donegal.

The journey is most often attempted by cyclists and walkers as a challenge route with the goal of raising money for charities and is also undertaken by motorists.

The distance of the routes commonly taken have been reported as between 600 and 644 km (373 and 413 miles).

Cycling
The current record for cycling from Mizen Head to Malin Head is 17 hours, 20 minutes and 45 seconds, set by Irish Ultra Cyclist Sean Hernon on 16 September 2021. In 2012 Irish Ultra Cyclist Ricky Geoghegan become the first person in history to cycle from Malin Head to Mizen Head and back non stop in a time of 55 hours, 37 minutes . The route is most commonly completed in around 5–6 days by cyclists.

Running 

Between 5 and 10 July 2011, Welsh International ultra-runner, Jennifer Salter (36), broke the existing End-to-End World Running record set by Ireland's Richard Donovan by over 14 hours by covering the  distance in 4 days, 23 hours, 3 minutes and 10 seconds. From 25 to 29 March 2012, Sharon Gayter (UK) broke the record again with a time of 4 days, 1 hour, 39 minutes and 55 seconds (which was verified as the world record by the Book of Alternative Records).  From 22 to 25 September 2012, Mimi Anderson (UK) broke the record once again with a time of 3 days 15 hours 36 minutes 23 seconds, as verified by Guinness World Records. From 29 April to 2 May 2017 Irish International ultra-runner Eoin Keith broke the record by over 11 hours with a time of 3 days, 3 hours, 47 minutes, as verified by Athletics Ireland.

Other uses of the phrase
The phrase is also used to represent the whole geographical extent of Ireland: "a Malin Head to Mizen Head approach".

See also
Land's End to John o' Groats
Du battant des lames au sommet des montagnes
Wild Atlantic Way

References

External links
Elias Fund: Run4Zimbabwe
Run4Zimbabwe
Dave Barter's account
 Running for Pearl

Geography of Ireland